Anachloris is a genus of moths in the family Geometridae, with three species, found in Australia, New Zealand and Papua New Guinea.

Species
 Anachloris subochraria (Doubleday, 1843) [Australia, New Zealand and (probably) Papua New Guinea]
 Anachloris tofocolorata Schmidt, 2001 [Australia]
 Anachloris uncinata (Guenée, 1857) [Australia]

References

Hydriomenini
Geometridae genera